This is a list of United States congressmen who have set records for longevity of service since the United States 1st Congress in 1789. It is divided up into several categories.

Uninterrupted time

House and Senate

Senate

House

Interrupted time

House and Senate

Senate

House

References

Cong
United States Congress